Julio Alberto Buffarini (born 18 August 1988) is an Argentine professional footballer who plays as a right-back for Talleres.

Club career
He spent his entire club career in South America until 5 August 2021, when he signed for Spanish Segunda División side SD Huesca. The following 27 January, he moved on loan to fellow league team FC Cartagena for the remainder of the season.

International career
In October 2016, Buffarini was called up to the national team by coach Edgardo Bauza, for a pair of World Cup Qualification Games against Brazil and Colombia. Buffarini failed to make an appearance during the matches.

Honours
San Lorenzo
Primera División: 2013 Inicial
Copa Libertadores: 2014
Supercopa Argentina: 2015

Boca Juniors
Primera División: 2017–18, 2019–20
Copa Argentina: 2019–20
Copa de la Liga Profesional: 2020
Supercopa Argentina: 2018

References

External links
 
 

1988 births
Living people
Argentine footballers
Argentine expatriate footballers
Argentine people of Italian descent
Footballers from Córdoba, Argentina
Association football fullbacks
Argentine Primera División players
Campeonato Brasileiro Série A players
Segunda División players
Talleres de Córdoba footballers
Atlético Tucumán footballers
Ferro Carril Oeste footballers
San Lorenzo de Almagro footballers
São Paulo FC players
Boca Juniors footballers
SD Huesca footballers
FC Cartagena footballers
Argentine expatriate sportspeople in Brazil
Argentine expatriate sportspeople in Spain
Expatriate footballers in Brazil
Expatriate footballers in Spain